St Laurence School is a coeducational secondary school and sixth form located in Bradford on Avon, Wiltshire, England. It became an Academy in August 2011.

Besides Bradford on Avon, the school takes pupils from Atworth, Monkton Farleigh, Winsley, Limpley Stoke, South Wraxall, Bradford Leigh, Trowbridge and Melksham. It is situated in the northwest of the town, off the road towards Little Ashley.

History

The school was founded in 1980 as a result of the merger of Fitzmaurice Grammar School and Trinity Secondary Modern school, opening on the Trinity site. It is named after the historically-important Saxon St Laurence's Church, Bradford-on-Avon.

Under the Specialist schools programme of 1997–2010 the school had Arts College status, resulting in extra investment in drama, music and dance facilities.

The school's teaching departments are spread across numerous buildings on the school site. The site also has a large sports hall and several sports courts, pitches and playing fields. A lecture theatre was built in 2007 and was joined by a state-of-the-art independent learning centre in 2011.

In October 2005, a helium balloon launched at a school fete on 24 September 2005 was found in Karesuando, Sweden.

Wiltshire Music Centre
The Wiltshire Music Centre opened in 1998. Private and curriculum-based music lessons are held in the classrooms and teaching rooms in this building; and school collective worships, exam presentations, and other special events are held in its main auditorium. The Music Centre also contains a recording studio.

Roman villa remains 

Aerial photographs and minor archaeological excavations in 1976 indicated the presence of the remains of a Roman villa underneath the school's sports fields. A more major excavation in 2003 uncovered Roman era floor mosaics and walls once belonging to this villa, along with a stone structure believed to have once been part of an early Christian baptistery.

Academic performance
In 2016, 79% of the school's GCSE pupils achieved grades 5 A* to C including English and Mathematics. Currently there are 1358 pupils attending the school, across key stages 3–5.

References

External links 
 
 EduBase
 School history – Wiltshire Council

Academies in Wiltshire
Educational institutions established in 1980
Roman villas in Wiltshire
1980 establishments in England
Secondary schools in Wiltshire
Bradford-on-Avon
Church of England secondary schools in the Diocese of Salisbury